The Semirechie electoral district was a constituency created for the 1917 Russian Constituent Assembly election. The electoral district covered the Semirechie Oblast. The electoral battle in Semirechie stood between a general soviet list (SRs and Mensheviks) and the Kirgiz-Cossack alliance. The Bolshevik list had been banned.

The Taranchin Committee had been formed in February 1917, as a faction of the General Muslim Committee. In the summer of 1917, it was joined by the Dungan (Hui) community, becoming the Taranchi-Dungan Committee.

Results

References

Electoral districts of the Russian Constituent Assembly election, 1917